Patan is the administrative seat of Patan District in the Indian state of Gujarat and is an administered municipality. It was the capital of Gujarat's Chavda and Chaulukya dynasties in medieval times, and is also known as Anhilpur-Patan to distinguish it from Prabhas Patan. During the rule of Gujarat Sultanate, it was the capital from 1407 to 1411.

Patan was established by the Chavda king Vanaraja. During the rule of several Hindu and Muslim dynasties, it thrived as a trading city and a regional capital of northern Gujarat. The city contains many Hindu and Jain temples as well as mosques, dargahs and rojas.

It is a historical place located on the bank of the now extinct Saraswati River. Patan has an old market which is quite sizeable and is believed to have been in continuous operation since at least the rule of Vaghelas.

History
Patan was established by the Chavda ruler Vanaraja in the ninth century as "Anahilapataka". During 10th-13th century, the city served as the capital of the Chaulukya dynasty, who succeeded the Chavdas.

Muhammed's general and later Sultan of Delhi Qutb-ud-din Aybak sacked the city between 1200 and 1210, and it was destroyed by the Allauddin Khilji in 1298. The modern town of Patan later sprung up near the ruins of Anhilwara. During 1304 to 1411, first Patan was the Suba headquarter of Delhi Sultanate and capital city of the Gujarat Sultanate after the collapse of the Delhi Sultanate at the end of the 14th century. A new fort was built by these Subas, a large portion of which (along with a few of the gates) is still intact. The old fort of the Hindu kingdom is nearly vanished and only a wall can be seen on the way from Kalka to Rani ki vav. In 1411, Sultan Ahmed Shah moved the capital to Ahmedabad.

Patan was part of the Baroda state from the mid-18th century until India's independence in 1947, when Baroda became part of Bombay state, which in 1960 was separated into Gujarat and Maharashtra.

Rani ki vav

During the period of the Chaulukya dynasty or Solankis, the stepwell called the Rani ki vav or Ran-ki vav (Queen's step well) was constructed. It is a richly sculptured monument, built by Udaymati in memory of her husband, Bhima I (1022-1063).

It was probably completed by Udaymati and Karna after his death. A reference to Udaymati building the monument is in the 'Prabandha-Chintamani' composed by Merutunga Suri in 1304 AD.

It was one of the largest and the most sumptuous structures of its type. It became silted up and much of it is not visible, except for some rows of sculptured panels in the circular part of the well. Among its ruins one pillar still stands which is proof of the elegance of its design and an excellent example of this period. A part of the west well is extant from which it appears that the wall had been built of brick and faced with stone. From this wall project vertical bracket in pairs, this supported the galleries of the well shaft proper. This bracketing is arranged in tiers and is richly carved.

There is a small gate below the last step of the step well which has a 30 km tunnel (now it has been blocked by stones and mud) which leads to the town of Sidhpur near Patan. It was used as an escape gateway for king who built the step well in the times of defeat.

This stepwell is the oldest and the deepest among the 120 other stepwell in Gujarat. The sculpture of Rani ki vav depicting Lord Vishnu's avatars, Hindu Goddesses, Jain idols and their ancestors. Most of the sculpture is in devotion to Vishnu, in the forms of his avatars (Krishna, Rama and others), representing their return to the world.

It was included in the list of UNESCO World Heritage Sites on 22 June 2014.

The modern city

Education
Patan is home to the Hemchandracharya North Gujarat University named after the famous polymath Acharya Hemachandra. It was previously known as North Gujarat University.

There are many schools and colleges in Patan. Sheth B.D. High School, P.P.G experimental higher secondary school and Junior College is the oldest. Other famous schools are P.P.G. Experimental High School, Adarsha Vidhyalaya, Bhagwati International Public School, Sheth M.N. High School, Sheth B.M. High School, Prerna Mandir High School, Pioneer School of Science, Lord Krishna School of Science and Eklavya School of Science.

There are K.D. Polytechnic Patan for diploma in engineering, Government Engineering College and Sheth M.N. Science College,Sheth M.N.Law College. Patan is the education hub in North Gujarat.

Medical
Patan is a prominent medical centre in North Gujarat with almost 200 practicing medical professionals. It has a medical college named GMERS Medical College and Hospital, Dharpur-Patan at Dharpur on Unjha Highway.

Major hospitals include General Hospital, Janta Hospital, Docter House, upcoming Naari Hospital and other Clinics in Patan.

Entertainment
PTN News and Anhil Group of Patan mutually organized Gujarat's most popular traditional festival Navratri Mahotsav "Khelaiya" from 2006 to 2018.

City Point Multiplex and Time Cinema provide Entertainment facilities.

Siddhhem Water Park & Resort is developing on Sariyad Highway near Rani Ki Vav.

Industries
Patan has a GIDC and the small and medium size industries and a new GIDC in Charup, Ta Sarawati District, Patan.

Market

Auction of agricultural product done here between farmers and buyers through commission agent is called APMC (Agriculture Product Market Committee)

Patan has a Vegetable Market on Chanasma Highway.

Patola sari

The patola sari is one of the finest hand-woven sarees produced today. This is a specialty of Patan. It is famous for extremely delicate patterns woven with great precision and clarity. A patola sari takes 4 to 6 months to make, depending on how complicated the designs is and if the length is 5 or 6 metres. This saris are totally colored with vegetable colors. Costs start from Rs. 20,000 which may go up to Rs. 20,00,000 even depending on the difficulty of work as many times gold threads are included during its weaving process.

There are only two families making Patola saris. They don't teach this art to other family members. Only their sons are eligible to learn.

Salvivad, a place where Patolas are woven along with places where traditional clay toys are made are worth visiting. Many annual religious fairs act as tourist destination.

It is an ancient art and needs to be preserved as well as nurtured. Local folks in Gujarat always praises the "Patan Na patola" being most costly item for the women to afford in Gujarat.

Tourist attractions

There are many tourist attractions including forts, vavs (step wells), talavs (lakes) and places of worship. The main tourist attractions are the Rani ki vav (World Heritage Site) and patola saris.

The remains of Old City of Patan are a very small portion of Old Fort near Kalka on the outskirts of the New City is of historical and archeological importance. So is the case with the remains of the walls of new fort and the Darwajas (gates) of the new fort which are fast disappearing. The administration and a majority of local people show little interest in preserving these heritage places which are shrinking at a rapid pace. The inner fort of Bhadra with its gates is preserved well.

Step wells include Rani ki vav and Trikam Barot ni Vav. Lakes include historically and archaeologically important Sahastralinga Tank, Anand Sarovar (Gungadi Talav) and Khan Sarovar.

Two famous architectural monuments have gain the status of national monuments. One of them is Sahastralinga tank and other one is Rani ki vav stepwell. Rani ki vav is an intricately constructed stepwell situated in the town of Patan in Gujarat, India. It is located on the banks of the now dried-up Saraswati River, which was a seasonal river even during its best period.

12 Darwajas (Gates)
Bagwada, Chhidiya, Mira, Aghara, Kothakooe, Phatipaal (Fatipal), Ghoonghdi, Kanasda (also known as Kalika), Khansarovar, Motishah, Bhathi, Lal, 12th is door and 1 window (in middle of city is called Ganesh Bari).

Places of worship

There are many places of significance on religious, historical or architerctural grounds. Being the state capital of Gujarat for long time the city has heritage associated with religious places as well. The spread of Jainism in Patan can be understood that the city stands third in number of Jain Derasar (Temples) after Palitana and Ahmedabad (Rajnagar).

Demographics

 India census, Patan had a population of 112,038. Males constitute 53% of the population and females 47%. Patan has an average literacy rate of 72%, higher than the national average of 59.5%: male literacy is 78%, and female literacy is 65%. In Patan, 11% of the population is under 6 years of age.

Hindus are the largest religious community of the city. other minority religious communities includes Muslims, Christians, Sikhs and Jains.
About 87% of the population is Hindu.

The history of Patan indicates that it was one of Jainism influenced state.

Politics
Patan is a constituency of the Gujarat Legislative Assembly within the Patan (Lok Sabha Constituency).

Transport

Local
City bus service is run by municipality connecting nearby village. Autorickshaw are available. Patan Bus Station is under renovation right now. It is going to be the modern Bus Station In north Gujarat. The New Bus Station Will Have Restaurants, Canteen, Multiplex cinema house, game zone, All kind of branded showrooms, and latest facilities. It will impact the commute of native people in good way.

Rail
 is 108 km from Ahmedabad Railway Station. Ahmedabad - Bhagat Ki Kothi (Jodhpur) Main line. It is also connected by rail to Mehsana, Ahmedabad and Okha by BG Line. Patan railway station is now connected with Bhildi Railway Station With New BG Line.
New train will start from Bandra to Bhagat Ki Kothi and connectivity to Rajasthan, Delhi, Mumbai.

Road
The National Highway 68 connecting Ramgarh in Rajasthan with the province of Gujarat passes through Patan-Chanasma, thus connecting it with the cities Jaisalmer, Barmer and Radhanpur.  State Highways SH 7, 10, 130 pass through Patan and connect it with the nearest cities of Gujarat.  National Highway 68 connects it with Mehsana, Himmatnagar and Ahmedabad.

Air
The nearest airport is Sardar Vallabhbhai Patel International Airport at Ahmedabad.

Mehsana Airport It is just 51 km From Patan city.

Deesa Airport It is just 53 km from Patan city.

See also
 Kumarapala (Chaulukya dynasty)
 Hemachandra

References

Further reading
 Prof. K.A. Nizami, ‘Foundation of the Delhi Sultanat’ in A Comprehensive History of India-Vol-V part one.
 Chandler, Tertius. 1987. Four Thousand Years of Urban Growth: An Historical Census. St. David's University Press.

External links
 Patan District Panchayat

Populated places established in the 8th century
Former capital cities in India
Cities and towns in Patan district